Dr. Ram Vilas Vedanti  (Hindi:डॉ राम विलास वेदांती; born 7 October 1958) is an Indian politician, Hindu religious leader and Member of Parliament of 12th Lok Sabha, affiliated to Bharatiya Janata Party serving Pratapgarh (UP) Lok Sabha Constituency. He is member of Shri Ram Janmabhoomi Trust.

References

People from Pratapgarh, Uttar Pradesh
Bharatiya Janata Party politicians from Uttar Pradesh
Indian socialists
1958 births
Living people
India MPs 1998–1999
People from Rewa district
Lok Sabha members from Uttar Pradesh
India MPs 1996–1997
People from Jaunpur district
Vishva Hindu Parishad members